J. (Joseph) Donald Capra (born 1937) is an American immunologist, physician-scientist, and was the 4th full-time president (1997–2007) and later, president emeritus, of the Oklahoma Medical Research Foundation (OMRF) in Oklahoma City, OK. While president, he helped to raise over $100 million and spearheaded major research growth in grants funded and faculty recruited to the institution.

Prior to becoming the 4th president of OMRF in 1997, Capra served as professor of microbiology and internal medicine and was named the Edwin L. Cox Distinguished Chair in Immunology and Genetics at the University of Texas Southwestern Medical Center in Dallas, Texas, from 1974 to 1997, also serving as the director of the UTSW Molecular Immunology Center from 1990 to 1997. Before moving to UT Southwestern, he was a faculty member of the Mt. Sinai School of Medicine in New York City between 1969 and 1974.

Capra is widely known for his studies of monoclonal antibodies.  His contributions to immunology have focused on the molecular features of antibody variable regions, including key discoveries related to the antibody combining site and its relationship to antibody idiotypy and the hypervariable regions of antibody molecules. He particularly studied the antibody combining sites and mutational genetics as they apply to both diseased and healthy states. Capra was an early leader in using human monoclonal antibodies from patients with lymphocytic malignancies helping to drive the field towards biopharmaceutical therapeutics, which now represents one of the largest segments of the pharmaceutical, diagnostic and research-based industries.  He was also involved in the development of mouse monoclonal antibodies directed against human tissues that are widely used as diagnostic reagents. He was among those who defined the subsets of human B lymphocytes.  These studies led to a redefinition of many human B cell malignancies, which became important in the treatment of many Non-Hodgkin’s Lymphomas.   He also co-authored a series of papers which utilized human plasmablasts after immunization to define the human immune response to influenza vaccine and generated human monoclonal antibodies from the blood.  These studies led to a single cell FACS-sorting based technology for the generation of monoclonal antibodies.

Capra is the author of more than 320 peer reviewed scientific articles. He has co-authored/edited 2 books: The Antibody Enigma (1984)  and Immunobiology 4th Edition (1999), co-edited seven volumes on The Antibodies with Maurizio Zanetti (1995–2002)  and has served on the review and editorial boards of many journals. He also served on the board of directors for Innexus Biotechnology Inc. in Scottsdale, AZ., and the scientific advisory board of AssureImmune, LLC in Boca Raton, FL. He has also served on state agencies including chairing the scientific advisory panel for the State of Oklahoma EDGE Initiative.

Biography 
A native of Vermont, Capra received his BS in chemistry in 1959 and his MD in 1963 from the University of Vermont in Burlington. At his graduation from the UVM College of Medicine in 1963, Capra received the William Brown Alumni Prize, named for a former dean of the College of Medicine, and the UVM Century Award. He interned at St. Luke’s Hospital in New York City between 1963 and 1969. He followed with postdoctoral fellowships at the National Institutes of Health with Dr. Alan Peterkofsky studying methyl deficient transfer RNA, and later, was a guest investigator and assistant physician under Dr. Henry Kunkel at The Rockefeller University in New York City between 1967 and 1969.

Capra is a founding member of the Henry Kunkel Society, a scientific organization dedicated to human disease research in the memory of its namesake.  It is made up of some of the world’s leading immunologists and physician researchers.  Capra has served several positions with the organization including serving as vice president, president and past president.

Capra has also been associated and/or trained many of today's immunologists, including Mike Carroll Ph.D., professor of pediatrics, Harvard Medical School, Jeff Hanke, executive VP of inflammation/immunology Boehringer Ingelheim, Inaki Sanz, M.D., professor of medicine, chief, Division of Rheumatology, Emory University and Virginia Pascual, M.D., Baylor Institute of Biomedical Studies.

Memberships 
Capra is a member of many scientific and professional organizations, including 
Sigma Xi, American Association for the Advancement of Science, American Rheumatism Association, American Association of Biological Chemists, American Society for Clinical Investigation, Association of American Physicians, Fellow of the American Association for the Advancement of Science, Honorary Member of the Societe Francaise d' Immunologie, and elected to the Norwegian Academy of Science and Letters. He was elected secretary treasurer of the American Association of Immunologists for 8 years, and served as a council member of the American Society for Clinical Investigation.

Publications 
Partial List:

References

External links 
 The Oklahoma Medical Research Foundation
 The American Society for Clinical Investigation_JDCapra

1937 births
Living people
University of Vermont alumni
American immunologists